In enzymology, a triphosphate-protein phosphotransferase is an enzyme that catalyzes the chemical reaction

triphosphate + [microsomal-membrane protein]  diphosphate + phospho-[microsomal-membrane protein]

Thus, the two substrates of this enzyme are triphosphate and microsomal-membrane protein, whereas its two products are diphosphate and [[phospho-[microsomal-membrane protein]]].

Classification 

This enzyme belongs to the family of transferases, specifically those transferring phosphorus-containing groups that are not covered by other phosphotransferase families.

Nomenclature 
The systematic name of this enzyme class is triphosphate:[microsomal-membrane-protein] phosphotransferase. Other names in common use include diphosphate:microsomal-membrane-protein O-phosphotransferase, (erroneous), DiPPT (erroneous), pyrophosphate:protein phosphotransferase (erroneous), diphosphate-protein phosphotransferase (erroneous), diphosphate:[microsomal-membrane-protein] O-phosphotransferase, and (erroneous).

References

 
 

EC 2.7.99
Enzymes of unknown structure